Bystry is a rural locality (a settlement) in Stepanovskoye Rural Settlement, Kudymkarsky District, Perm Krai, Russia. The population was 187 as of 2010. There are 9 streets.

Geography 
Bystry is located 4 km south of Kudymkar (the district's administrative centre) by road. Yurino is the nearest rural locality.

References 

Rural localities in Kudymkarsky District